In Greco-Roman mythology, Aeneas (from ) was a Trojan hero, the son of the Dardanian prince Anchises and the Greek goddess Aphrodite (equivalent to the Roman Venus). His father was a first cousin of King Priam of Troy (both being grandsons of Ilus, founder of Troy), making Aeneas a second cousin to Priam's children (such as Hector and Paris). He is a minor character in Greek mythology and is mentioned in Homer's Iliad. Aeneas receives full treatment in Roman mythology, most extensively in Virgil's Aeneid, where he is cast as an ancestor of Romulus and Remus. He became the first true hero of Rome. Snorri Sturluson identifies him with the Norse god Vidarr of the Æsir.

Etymology 

Aeneas is the Romanization of the hero's original Greek name  (Aineías). Aineías is first introduced in the Homeric Hymn to Aphrodite when Aphrodite gives him his name from the adjective 
(
"terrible"), for the "terrible grief" he has caused her by being born a mortal who will age and die. It is a popular etymology for the name, apparently exploited by Homer in the Iliad. Later in the Medieval period there were writers who held that, because the Aeneid was written by a philosopher, it is meant to be read philosophically. However, there is no certainty regarding the origin of his name.

Epithets
In imitation of the Iliad, Virgil borrows epithets of Homer, including: Anchisiades, magnanimum, magnus, heros, and bonus. Though he borrows many, Virgil gives Aeneas two epithets of his own, in the Aeneid: pater and pius. The purpose of these epithets seems to enforce the notion of Aeneas' divine hand as father and founder of the Roman race, and their use seems circumstantial: when Aeneas is praying he refers to himself as pius, and is referred to as such by the author only when the character is acting on behalf of the gods to fulfill his divine mission. Likewise, Aeneas is called pater when acting in the interest of his men.

Description 
Aeneas was described by the chronicler Malalas in his account of the Chronography as "shortish, thick, good chest, strong, ruddy, flat-faced, good nose, pale, balding, good beard". Meanwhile, in the account of Dares the Phrygian, he was illustrated as "auburn-haired, stocky, eloquent, courteous, prudent, pious, and charming. His eyes were black and twinkling."

Greek myth and epos

Homeric Hymn to Aphrodite

The story of the birth of Aeneas is told in the Homeric Hymn to Aphrodite, one of the major Homeric Hymns. Aphrodite has caused Zeus to fall in love with mortal women. In retaliation, Zeus puts desire in her heart for Anchises, who is tending his cattle among the hills near Mount Ida. When Aphrodite sees him she is smitten. She adorns herself as if for a wedding among the gods and appears before him. He is overcome by her beauty, believing that she is a goddess, but Aphrodite identifies herself as a Phrygian princess. After they make love, Aphrodite reveals her true identity to him and Anchises fears what might happen to him as a result of their liaison. Aphrodite assures him that he will be protected, and tells him that she will bear him a son to be called Aeneas. However, she warns him that he must never tell anyone that he has lain with a goddess. When Aeneas is born, Aphrodite takes him to the nymphs of Mount Ida, instructing them to raise the child to age five, then take him to Anchises. According to other sources, Anchises later brags about his encounter with Aphrodite, and as a result is struck in the foot with a thunderbolt by Zeus. Thereafter he is lame in that foot, so that Aeneas has to carry him from the flames of Troy.

Homer's Iliad

Aeneas is a minor character in the Iliad, where he is twice saved from death by the gods as if for an as-yet-unknown destiny, but is an honorable warrior in his own right. Having held back from the fighting, aggrieved with Priam because in spite of his brave deeds he was not given his due share of honour, he leads an attack against Idomeneus to recover the body of his brother-in-law Alcathous at the urging of Deiphobus. He is the leader of the Trojans' Dardanian allies, as well as a second cousin and principal lieutenant of Hector, son and heir of the Trojan king Priam.

Aeneas's mother Aphrodite frequently comes to his aid on the battlefield, and he is a favorite of Apollo. Aphrodite and Apollo rescue Aeneas from combat with Diomedes of Argos, who nearly kills him, and carry him away to Pergamos for healing. Even Poseidon, who usually favors the Greeks, comes to Aeneas's rescue after he falls under the assault of Achilles, noting that Aeneas, though from a junior branch of the royal family, is destined to become king of the Trojan people.

Bruce Louden presents Aeneas as a "type": The sole virtuous individual (or family) spared from general destruction, following the mytheme of Utnapishtim, Baucis and Philemon, Noah, and Lot. Pseudo-Apollodorus in his Bibliotheca explains that "... the Greeks [spared] him alone, on account of his piety."

Other sources
The Roman mythographer Gaius Julius Hyginus (c. 64 BCE – CE 17) in his Fabulae credits Aeneas with killing 28 enemies in the Trojan War. Aeneas also appears in the Trojan narratives attributed to Dares Phrygius and Dictys of Crete.

Roman myth and literature

The history of Aeneas was continued by Roman authors. One influential source was the account of Rome's founding in Cato the Elder's Origines. The Aeneas legend was well known in Virgil's day and appeared in various historical works, including the Roman Antiquities of the Greek historian Dionysius of Halicarnassus (relying on Marcus Terentius Varro), Ab Urbe Condita by Livy (probably dependent on Quintus Fabius Pictor, fl. 200 BCE), and Gnaeus Pompeius Trogus (now extant only in an epitome by Justin).

Virgil's Aeneid

The Aeneid explains that Aeneas is one of the few Trojans who were not killed or enslaved when Troy fell. Aeneas, after being commanded by the gods to flee, gathered a group, collectively known as the Aeneads, who then traveled to Italy and became progenitors of the Romans. The Aeneads included Aeneas's trumpeter Misenus, his father Anchises, his friends Achates, Sergestus, and Acmon, the healer Iapyx, the helmsman Palinurus, and his son Ascanius (also known as Iulus, Julus, or Ascanius Julius). He carried with him the Lares and Penates, the statues of the household gods of Troy, and transplanted them to Italy.

Several attempts to find a new home failed; one such stop was on Sicily, where in Drepanum, on the island's western coast, his father, Anchises, died peacefully.

After a brief but fierce storm sent up against the group at Juno's request, Aeneas and his fleet made landfall at Carthage after six years of wanderings.  Aeneas had a year-long affair with the Carthaginian queen Dido (also known as Elissa), who proposed that the Trojans settle in her land and that she and Aeneas reign jointly over their peoples. A marriage of sorts was arranged between Dido and Aeneas at the instigation of Juno, who was told that her favorite city would eventually be defeated by the Trojans' descendants. Aeneas's mother Venus (the Roman adaptation of Aphrodite) realized that her son and his company needed a temporary respite to reinforce themselves for the journey to come. However, the messenger god Mercury was sent by Jupiter and Venus to remind Aeneas of his journey and his purpose, compelling him to leave secretly. When Dido learned of this, she uttered a curse that would forever pit Carthage against Rome, an enmity that would culminate in the Punic Wars. She then committed suicide by stabbing herself with the same sword she gave Aeneas when they first met.

After the sojourn in Carthage, the Trojans returned to Sicily where Aeneas organized funeral games to honor his father, who had died a year before. The company traveled on and landed on the western coast of Italy. Aeneas descended into the underworld where he met Dido (who turned away from him to return to her husband) and his father, who showed him the future of his descendants and thus the history of Rome.

Latinus, king of the Latins, welcomed Aeneas's army of exiled Trojans and let them reorganize their lives in Latium. His daughter Lavinia had been promised to Turnus, king of the Rutuli, but Latinus received a prophecy that Lavinia would be betrothed to one from another land – namely, Aeneas. Latinus heeded the prophecy, and Turnus consequently declared war on Aeneas at the urging of Juno, who was aligned with King Mezentius of the Etruscans and Queen Amata of the Latins. Aeneas's forces prevailed. Turnus was killed, and Virgil's account ends abruptly.

Other sources
The rest of Aeneas's biography is gleaned from other ancient sources, including Livy and Ovid's Metamorphoses. According to Livy, Aeneas was victorious but Latinus died in the war. Aeneas founded the city of Lavinium, named after his wife. He later welcomed Dido's sister, Anna Perenna, who then committed suicide after learning of Lavinia's jealousy. After Aeneas's death, Venus asked Jupiter to make her son immortal. Jupiter agreed. The river god Numicus cleansed Aeneas of all his mortal parts and Venus anointed him with ambrosia and nectar, making him a god. Aeneas was recognized as the god Jupiter Indiges.

English mythology 

The English once widely claimed as history, an original peopling of their isle – prior to the event, a land only of fantastical giants – by descendants of Eneas, though even in the time of the Renaissance, a non-English audience as well at least one English writer found details of the stories less than convincing.

The island known later as Britain, was also previously known as Alba, similarity of name supporting connection to the city of Alba in Italy, said to have been built by Alcanius, son of Eneas, and third ruler of the Latins after Latinus, being either his grandson or step-grandson.

Even if one ignored obviously far-fetched elements of this foundation myth of Britain, Johannes Rastell writing in 1529 questioned, along these lines:  Supposing the original Brits were descendents of a line of Latin kings — Brute the son of Silvius, son Alcanius, son of Eneas who came to the Italian peninsula from Troy — then why should such a fact have escaped record in the writings of Julius Caesar when that Roman military supreme commander had personally surveyed the lands there he had conquered for Rome by 48 BC? And indeed, why should the son Brutus have escaped from Latin histories altogether, given they did deal with Silvius and Alcanius, and 'all theyr childera & what became of them & how they endyd that succeeded them as kyngis'?

Other details he found were able to be discounted without resort to factual records, or with only very few facts needed other than everyday experience. Were the early inhabitants of Britain giants, descended from the Devil in union with 32 daughters of a king Dioclisian of Syria?  To Rastell, if the devil had power to sow such seeds at the earlier time, then why not in his own time?  Where were the giants today?

Other fanciful elements he reduced by logical deduction from intuitive psychological insights, for example the greatly diminished chance of 32 daughters married to 32 kings on a single day, and all cooperating to kill those 32 husbands in a single night ; or in combination with analysis of logistical realities, such as the suggested voyage of all 32 murderous widows to Britain without dispersion or diversion, over three thousand miles.

Rastell was further able to discount the likelihood of any factuality to that ancient tale, due to his failure to discover after diligent research, any authentic record of its origin or explanation as to why such record should be absent.

Further reading 
 One surviving version of the Brut chronicle is a late Middle Ages manuscript, known as the St Albans Chronicle.

Medieval accounts
Snorri Sturlason, in the Prologue of the Prose Edda, tells of the world as parted in three continents: Africa, Asia and the third part called Europe or Enea. Snorri also tells of a Trojan named Munon) (or Mennon), who marries the daughter of the High King (Yfirkonungr) Priam called Troan and travels to distant lands, marries the Sybil and got a son, Tror, who, as Snorri tells, is identical to Thor. This tale resembles some episodes of the Aeneid.
Continuations of Trojan matter in the Middle Ages had their effects on the character of Aeneas as well. The 12th-century French Roman d'Enéas addresses Aeneas's sexuality. Though Virgil appears to deflect all homoeroticism onto Nisus and Euryalus, making his Aeneas a purely heterosexual character, in the Middle Ages there was at least a suspicion of homoeroticism in Aeneas. The Roman d'Enéas addresses that charge, when Queen Amata opposes Aeneas's marrying Lavinia.

Medieval interpretations of Aeneas were greatly influenced by both Virgil and other Latin sources. Specifically, the accounts by Dares and Dictys, which were reworked by the 13th-century Italian writer Guido delle Colonne (in Historia destructionis Troiae), colored many later readings. From Guido, for instance, the Pearl Poet and other English writers get the suggestion that Aeneas's safe departure from Troy with his possessions and family was a reward for treason, for which he was chastised by Hecuba. In Sir Gawain and the Green Knight (late 14th century) the Pearl Poet, like many other English writers, employed Aeneas to establish a genealogy for the foundation of Britain, and explains that Aeneas was "impeached for his perfidy, proven most true" (line 4).

Family and legendary descendants

Aeneas had an extensive family tree. His wet-nurse was Caieta, and he is the father of Ascanius with Creusa, and of Silvius with Lavinia. Ascanius, also known as Iulus (or Julius), founded Alba Longa and was the first in a long series of kings. According to the mythology used by Virgil in the Aeneid, Romulus and Remus were both descendants of Aeneas through their mother Rhea Silvia, making Aeneas the progenitor of the Roman people. Some early sources call him their father or grandfather, but once the dates of the fall of Troy (1184 BCE) and the founding of Rome (753 BCE) became accepted, authors added generations between them. The Julian family of Rome, most notably Julius Cæsar and Augustus, traced their lineage to Ascanius and Aeneas, thus to the goddess Venus. Through the Julians, the Palemonids make this claim. The legendary kings of Britain – including King Arthur – trace their family through a grandson of Aeneas, Brutus.

Character and appearance

Aeneas's consistent epithet in Virgil and other Latin authors is pius, a term that connotes reverence toward the gods and familial dutifulness.

In the Aeneid, Aeneas is described as strong and handsome, but neither his hair colour nor complexion are described. In late antiquity however sources add further physical descriptions. The De excidio Troiae of Dares Phrygius describes Aeneas as "auburn-haired, stocky, eloquent, courteous, prudent, pious, and charming". There is also a brief physical description found in the 6th-century  John Malalas' Chronographia: "Aeneas: short, fat, with a good chest, powerful, with a ruddy complexion, a broad face, a good nose, fair skin, bald on the forehead, a good beard, grey eyes."

Modern portrayals

Literature
Aeneas appears as a character in William Shakespeare's play Troilus and Cressida, set during the Trojan War.

Aeneas and Dido are the main characters of a 17th-century broadside ballad called "The Wandering Prince of Troy". The ballad ultimately alters Aeneas's fate from traveling on years after Dido's death to joining her as a spirit soon after her suicide.

In modern literature, Aeneas is the speaker in two poems by Allen Tate, "Aeneas at Washington" and "Aeneas at New York". He is a main character in Ursula K. Le Guin's Lavinia, a re-telling of the last six books of the Aeneid told from the point of view of Lavinia, daughter of King Latinus of Latium.

Aeneas appears in David Gemmell's Troy series as a main heroic character who goes by the name Helikaon.

In Rick Riordan's book series The Heroes of Olympus, Aeneas is regarded as the first Roman demigod, son of Venus rather than Aphrodite.

Will Adams' novel City of the Lost assumes that much of the information provided by Virgil is mistaken, and that the true Aeneas and Dido did not meet and love in Carthage but in a Phoenician colony at Cyprus, on the site of the modern Famagusta. Their tale is interspersed with that of modern activists who, while striving to stop an ambitious Turkish Army general trying to stage a coup, accidentally discover the hidden ruins of Dido's palace.

Opera, film and other media

Aeneas is a title character in Henry Purcell's opera Dido and Aeneas (c. 1688), and Jakob Greber's  (Aeneas in Carthage) (1711), and one of the principal roles in Hector Berlioz' opera Les Troyens (c. 1857), as well as in Metastasio's immensely popular opera libretto Didone abbandonata. Canadian composer James Rolfe composed his opera Aeneas and Dido (2007; to a libretto by André Alexis) as a companion piece to Purcell's opera.

Despite its many dramatic elements, Aeneas's story has generated little interest from the film industry. Ronald Lewis portrayed Aeneas in Helen of Troy, directed by Robert Wise, as a supporting character, who is a member of the Trojan Royal family, and a close and loyal friend to Paris, and escapes at the end of the film. Portrayed by Steve Reeves, he was the main character in the 1961 sword and sandal film Guerra di Troia (The Trojan War).  Reeves reprised the role the following year in the film The Avenger, about Aeneas's arrival in Latium and his conflicts with local tribes as he tries to settle his fellow Trojan refugees there.

Giulio Brogi, portrayed as Aeneas in the 1971 Italian TV miniseries series called Eneide, which gives the whole story of the Aeneid, from Aeneas escape from to Troy, to his meeting of Dido, his arrival in Italy, and his duel with Turnus.

The most recent cinematic portrayal of Aeneas was in the film Troy, in which he appears as a youth charged by Paris to protect the Trojan refugees, and to continue the ideals of the city and its people. Paris gives Aeneas Priam's sword, in order to give legitimacy and continuity to the royal line of Troy – and lay the foundations of Roman culture. In this film, he is not a member of the royal family and does not appear to fight in the war.

In the role-playing game Vampire: The Requiem by White Wolf Game Studios, Aeneas figures as one of the mythical founders of the Ventrue Clan.

in the action game Warriors: Legends of Troy, Aeneas is a playable character. The game ends with him and the Aeneans fleeing Troy's destruction and, spurned by the words of a prophetess thought crazed, goes to a new country (Italy) where he will start an empire greater than Greece and Troy combined that shall rule the world for 1000 years, never to be outdone in the tale of men (The Roman Empire).

In the 2018 TV miniseries Troy: Fall of a City, Aeneas is portrayed by Alfred Enoch. He also featured as an Epic Fighter of the Dardania faction in the Total War Saga: Troy in 2020.

Depictions in art
Scenes depicting Aeneas, especially from the Aeneid, have been the focus of study for centuries. They have been the frequent subject of art and literature since their debut in the 1st century.

Villa Valmarana
The artist Giovanni Battista Tiepolo was commissioned by Gaetano Valmarana in 1757 to fresco several rooms in the Villa Valmarana, the family villa situated outside Vicenza. Tiepolo decorated the palazzina with scenes from epics such as Homer's Iliad and Virgil's Aeneid.

Aeneas flees Troy

Aeneas with Dido

Family tree

See also
 Cumaean Sibyl
 Lacrimae rerum
 The Golden Bough
 Latin kings of Alba Longa

Notes

References

Sources
 Homer, Iliad II. 819–21; V. 217–575; XIII. 455–544; XX. 75–352.
 Apollodorus, Bibliotheca III. xii. 2; Epitome III. 32–IV. 2; V. 21.
 Virgil, Aeneid.
 Ovid, Metamorphoses XIII. 623–715; XIV. 75–153; 581–608.
 Ovid, Heroides, VII.
 Livy, Book 1.1–2.
 Dictys Cretensis.
 Dares Phrygius.

Further reading
 Cramer, D. "The Wrath of Aeneas: Iliad 13.455–67 and 20.75–352." Syllecta Classica, vol. 11, 2000, pp. 16–33. .
 de Vasconcellos, P.S. "A Sound Play on Aeneas' Name in the Aeneid: A Brief Note on VII.69." Vergilius (1959–), vol. 61, 2015, pp. 125–29. .
 Farron, S. "The Aeneas–Dido Episode as an Attack on Aeneas' Mission and Rome." Greece & Rome, vol. 27, no. 1, 1980, pp. 34–47. . .
 Gowers, E. "Trees and Family Trees in the Aeneid." Classical Antiquity, vol. 30, no. 1, 2011, pp. 87–118. . .
 Grillo, L. "Leaving Troy and Creusa: Reflections on Aeneas' Flight." The Classical Journal, vol. 106, no. 1, 2010, pp. 43–68. . .
 Noonan, J. "Sum Pius Aeneas: Aeneas and the Leader as Conservator/Σωτήρ" The Classical Bulletin. vol. 83, no. 1, 2007, pp. 65–91.
 Putnam, M.C.J. The Humanness of Heroes: Studies in the Conclusion of Virgil's Aeneid. The Amsterdam Vergil lectures, 1. Amsterdam: Amsterdam University Press, 2011.
 Starr, R.J. "Aeneas the Rhetorician: 'Aeneid IV', 279–95." Latomus, vol. 62, no. 1, 2003, pp. 36–46. .
 Scafoglio, G. "The Betrayal of Aeneas." Greek, Roman and Byzantine Studies, vol. 53 no. 1, 2013, pp. 1–14.
 Schauer, M. Aeneas dux in Vergils Aeneis. Eine literarische Fiktion in augusteischer Zeit. Zetemata vol. 128. Munich: C.H. Beck, 2007.

External links

 Warburg Institute Iconographic Database (about 900 images related to the Aeneid)

Trojans
Characters in the Aeneid
Greek mythological heroes
Children of Aphrodite
Characters in Roman mythology
Heroes who ventured to Hades
Demigods in classical mythology
Legendary progenitors
Metamorphoses characters
Articles containing video clips